The Church-Field was an electric car manufactured in Sibley, Michigan, by the Church-Field Motor Company from 1912–1913.  The Church-Field had an underslung chassis, and used a two-speed transmission. With a choice of ten electrical selector positions, it gave the vehicle a total choice of twenty speed ranges. Two body styles were offered - a roadster selling for $2300, and a coupe for $2800.

The car was launched at the Detroit Automobile Show in January 1912, but production and sales were minimal, with the result that the factory was closed in September 1913. The assets of the company were sold in 1915 for just $600.

References

External links
1912 advertisement

Defunct motor vehicle manufacturers of the United States
Motor vehicle manufacturers based in Michigan
Electric vehicles introduced in the 20th century
Defunct companies based in Michigan
Companies based in Wayne County, Michigan